The 2013–14 Weber State Wildcats men's basketball team represented Weber State University during the 2013–14 NCAA Division I men's basketball season. The Wildcats were led by eighth year head coach Randy Rahe and played their home games at the Dee Events Center. They were members of the Big Sky Conference. They finished the season 19–12, 14–6 in Big Sky play to win the Big Sky regular season championship. They were also champions of the Big Sky Conference tournament to earn an automatic bid to the NCAA tournament where they lost in the second round to Arizona.

Radio broadcasts
All Wildcats games will be heard on KLO (Ogden) and KLO-FM (Salt Lake City), nicknamed KLO AM/FM. KLO is a move from the previous radio broadcast group of 1280 AM, but radio broadcasts will still be done online via Big Sky TV for non-televised home games and on KLOradio.com for all games. Carl Arky will call every game that doesn't conflict with football broadcasts. Dutch Belnap will return as the radio analyst.

Before the season

Departures

Recruits

Roster

Schedule

|-
!colspan=9 style=| Exhibition

|-
!colspan=9 style=| Regular season

|-
!colspan=9 style=| Big Sky tournament

|-
!colspan=9 style=| NCAA tournament

References

Weber State Wildcats men's basketball seasons
Weber State
Weber State
Weber State Wildcats men's basketball
Weber State Wildcats men's basketball